Ilex opaca, the American holly, is a species of holly, native to the eastern and south-central United States, from coastal Massachusetts south to central Florida, and west to southeastern Missouri and eastern Texas.

Description
The bark is light gray, roughened by small warty lumps. The branchlets are stout, green at first and covered with rusty down, later smooth and brown. The winter buds are brown, short, obtuse or acute.

The leaves remain on the branches for two to three years, finally falling in the spring when pushed off by growing buds.

The flowers are greenish white, small, borne in late spring in short pedunculate cymes from the axils of young leaves or scattered along the base of young branches. The calyx is small, four-lobed, imbricate in the bud, acute, margins ciliate, persistent. The corolla is white, with four petal-like lobes united at the base, obtuse, spreading, hypogynous, imbricate in bud. The flower stem is hairy with a minute bract at base. Like all hollies, it is dioecious, with separate male and female plants; only female plants produce the characteristic red berries. One male can pollenize several females. Male flowers have four stamens, inserted on the base of the corolla, alternate with its lobes; filaments awl-shaped, exserted in the sterile, much shorter in the sterile flower; anthers attached at the back, oblong, introrse, two-celled, cells opening longitudinally. The pistil on female flowers has a superior ovary, four-celled, rudimentary in staminate flowers; style wanting, stigma sessile, four-lobed; ovules one or two in each cell.

The fruit is a small red drupe 6–12 mm diameter containing four seeds; it is often persistent into winter.
A ratio of three female plants to one male plant is required for ideal fruit production.

Subspecies and varieties
Ilex opaca subsp. arenicola (Ashe) A.E. Murray 
Ilex opaca var. laxiflora (Lam.) Nutt. 
Ilex opaca subsp. opaca
Ilex opaca var. opaca

Ecology
Ilex opaca typically grows as an understory tree in moist forests of the east-central, southeastern, and south-central United States. It is found in sparse numbers in the northern part of its range from Cape Cod, Massachusetts, south to northern New Jersey (including southern Connecticut and southeastern New York). It is abundant further south on the Gulf and Atlantic lowlands. The branches are short and slender. The roots are thick and fleshy. It will grow in both dry and swampy soil, but grows slowly.  Ilex opaca var. arenicola, or scrub holly, is found as a shrub component in xeric scrub habitats of the Florida peninsula. This plant is shade tolerant.The ideal yearly precipitation average for the species ranges from 102 cm to 165 cm.

The flowers are pollinated by insects, including bees, wasps, ants, and night-flying moths. It is a larval host plant for Callophrys henrici. The tree also forms a thick canopy which offers protection for birds from predators and storms. Songbirds including thrushes, mockingbirds, catbirds, bluebirds and thrashers, as well as some gamebirds and mammals frequently feed on the berries.

Cultivation and uses
The wood is very pale, tough, close-grained, takes a good polish, and is used for whip-handles, engraving blocks and also cabinet work. It can also be dyed and used as a substitute for ebony. It has a density of 0.58 to 0.64.  The sap is watery, and contains a bitter substance used as an herbal tonic.

Leaves from the American holly can be used to make a tea-like beverage. American holly tea does not contain caffeine.

Ornamental plant
Ilex opaca is often cultivated by plant nurseries for use as a broadleaf evergreen ornamental plant, planted as a shrub or slower growing ornamental tree. Over 1,000 cultivars have been selected, including plants selected for cold tolerance ('Cobalt', a male cultivar, is able to tolerate temperatures as low as −32 °C), growth form (e.g. dwarf forms such as 'Cardinal Hedge', a female plant growing to 1.2 m tall), and color and abundance of fruit (notable female cultivars including the large-berried 'Yule', and the yellow-berried 'Canary' and 'Morgan Gold'). With Ilex cassine it is a parent of the hybrid Ilex × attenuata, which has ornamental cultivars.

The holly in winter

Holly is a popular winter Christmas and holiday season decoration. In English poetry and English stories the holly is inseparably connected with the merry-making and greetings which gather around the Christmas time. The custom is followed in North America, and holly and mistletoe  are widely used for decoration of homes and churches.

The European holly is smaller than the American holly, but closely resembles the American holly. The leaves of both species are similar in outline and toothed and bristled very much the same way, but the leaves are brighter in the American holly and larger. The American holly, called the evergreen or Christmas holly (Ilex opaca Aiton) was named the state tree of Delaware on 1 May 1939.

Holly fruit (drupes) appear late in the season, and whether due to the need to ripen or being a food of last resort, often last until midwinter. They are poisonous to dogs, cats, and humans, often causing diarrhea, vomiting, dehydration, and drowsiness if ingested. Cedar Waxwings will strip the trees of fruit if they are not already bare during their northward migration.

References

opaca
Trees of humid continental climate
Plants described in 1789
Flora of the United States
Trees of the United States
Garden plants of North America
Ornamental trees
Shrubs